Maja e Elbunit is a mountain in Albania, located in the Accursed Mountains range. It reaches a height of 2,231m high and is in the Shalë area near the centre of the range.

Mountains of Albania
Accursed Mountains